William Crichton may refer to:
 William Crichton, 1st Lord Crichton (died 1454), political figure in the late medieval Kingdom of Scotland
 William Crichton (Jesuit) (c. 1535–1617), Scottish Jesuit
 William Crichton (engineer) (1827–1889), Scottish engineer and shipbuilder in Turku, Grand Duchy of Finland
 Wm. Crichton & Co., an engineering and shipbuilding company that operated in Turku
 William Crichton, 2nd Earl of Dumfries (1598–1691)
 William Crichton (minister) (1630–1708), Scottish minister, who served as Moderator of the General Assembly in both 1692 and 1697